"Spiders Georg" is a meme that has circulated on Tumblr since 2013. It was created by Max Lavergne as a joke about a misconception on humans accidentally swallowing spiders, and would see an uptick in popularity the following year. Users have adapted the meme's format to several other topics, mimicking the spelling and grammar errors contained in the original post.

History 
Spiders Georg was first posted about in 2013 by Max Lavergne; it is based on the misconception that humans swallow some number of spiders a year inadvertently. While not true, the factoid has become an urban legend. Spiders Georg satirizes the factoid by offering its own explanation for the statistic, creating a fictional character who skews the average by eating tens of thousands daily.

The meme received some initial traction, amassing over 90,000 notes on the platform by the end of the year. The Daily Dot noted at the time that the meme remained too niche to make it into Tumblr's 2013 Year in Review. Spiders Georg experienced a resurgence in popularity in April 2014; users frequently remake and remix the meme to center around different topics, such as the Beatles' lyric "we all live in a yellow submarine" and "not all men". Many of the reposts mimic the spelling and grammar errors contained in the original post. The post has inspired a Spiders-Georg-themed blog on Tumblr, and users have reported having dreams about Spiders Georg or attempted to calculate how many spiders he would have to eat to make the urban legend true.

Katrin Tiidenberg, Natalie Ann Hendry, and Crystal Abidin, in their book entitled Tumblr, link the meme to their argument that Tumblr's impact is not well-understood through statistics alone. When one user cited USA Today to say that the average Tumblr user spends 2.5 hours per month on the site, another user responded that "the average person spends 0 hours per month. We Georg, who live in caves & spend over 23 hours on tumblr each day, are outliers and should not have been counted". As of 2021, the post has received over 1.1 million notes.

References 

Internet memes introduced in 2013
Tumblr